Oak Valley may refer to:

Australia 
 Oak Valley, Queensland, near Townsville
 Oak Valley, South Australia, an indigenous Australian community

Canada 
 Oak Valley Health, a regional health care system

United States 
 Oak Valley, California
 Oak Valley, Kansas
 Oak Valley, New Jersey
 Oak Valley, Texas

See also 

 Oak Valley Township (disambiguation)